Beer in Portugal has a long history, going as far back as the time of the ancient Roman province of Lusitania, where beer was commonly made and drunk. Portugal is among the 11 largest beer producers in Europe, and is the 7th largest European exporter of the product.

The word for beer in Portuguese is cerveja, coming from the Latin word cerevisia. Modern Portuguese breweries were started in Portugal in the 19th century. Portugal's Estado Novo regime, headed by António Salazar, protected national industry from foreign control, including the beer sector, during his time in power. Brewing in Portugal was long dominated by two companies — Unicer - Bebidas de Portugal, S.A. and Sociedade Central de Cervejas, S.A. They were created from the remains of well-established Portuguese brewers after the 1974 military coup, when the industry was nationalised. Both were privatised in the 1990s. Between them, they control more than 90% of the Portuguese beer market.

In 2003, Portugal had seven major breweries, employing approximately 1,848 people.

There are also around one hundred small breweries in the country, dedicated to the production of craft beer.

Native beers

Cergal
Cintra
Coral
Cristal
Especial
Imperial
Maldita
Melo Abreu Especial
Melo Abreu Munich
Nortada
Onix
Sagres 
Sovina
Super Bock 
Tagus
Topazio
Zarco

Breweries

Central de Cervejas
Cereuro
Cervejeira Lusitana
Dois Corvos
Drink In 
Empresa de Cervejas da Madeira
Fábrica de Cervejas e Refrigerantes João Melo Abreu
Faustino Microcervejeira ( Maldita )
Três Cervejeiros, Lda
Super Bock Group
Font Salem
Gallas

See also

 Beer and breweries by region

References

External links
 ( Maldita )
Empresa de Cervejas da Madeira (in Portuguese)
www.sumolis.pt - Cereuro Brewery
www.doiscorvos.pt - Dois Corvos Brewery
www.unicer.pt
www.cervejacintra.pt
www.superbock.pt
www.cervejacoral.com

Gallas.beer 
Portuguese Beer Caps (in Polish and Russian)